Dharchula Legislative Assembly constituency is one of the seventy electoral Uttarakhand Legislative Assembly constituencies of Uttarakhand state in India. It includes Dharchula area of Pithoragarh District.

Dharchula Legislative Assembly constituency is a part of Almora (Lok Sabha constituency).

Election results

2022

Members of Legislative Assembly

See also
 Almora (Lok Sabha constituency)

References

External links
 
http://eci.nic.in/eci_main/CurrentElections/CONSOLIDATED_ORDER%20_ECI%20.pdf. The Election Commission of India. p. 509.
http://ceo.uk.gov.in/files/Election2012/RESULTS_2012_Uttarakhand_State.pdf
https://web.archive.org/web/20090619064401/http://gov.ua.nic.in/ceouttranchal/ceo/ac_pc.aspx
https://web.archive.org/web/20101201021552/http://gov.ua.nic.in/ceouttranchal/ceo/ac_detl.aspx

Haridwar
2002 establishments in Uttarakhand
Assembly constituencies of Uttarakhand
Constituencies established in 2002